Jujols is a commune in the Pyrénées-Orientales department in southern France.

Geography 
Jujols is located in the canton of Les Pyrénées catalanes and in the arrondissement of Prades.

Government and politics

Mayors

Demography

Sites of interest 

 Church Saint-Julien-et-Sainte-Basilisse, from the 11th century.

See also
Communes of the Pyrénées-Orientales department

References

Communes of Pyrénées-Orientales